The 2011–12 CEV Cup was the 40th edition of the European CEV Cup volleyball club tournament.

Russian club Dynamo Moscow beat Polish club Asseco Resovia in both final matches and won the tournament for the first time.

Participating teams

Main phase

16th Finals

|}

8th Finals

|}

4th Finals

|}

Challenge phase

|}

First leg 

|}

Second leg 

|}

Final phase

Semi finals

|}

First leg

|}

Second leg

|}

Final

First leg

|}

Second leg

|}

Final standings

References

External links
 Official site

CEV Cup
2011 in volleyball
2012 in volleyball